Javier Estrada may refer to:
Javier Estrada (professor) (born 1964), Spanish-Argentinian finance professor
Javier Estrada González (born 1967), Mexican politician
Xavier Estrada Fernández (born 1976), Spanish football referee
Javier Estrada, Spanish singer and La Granja VIP contestant